Today, forest and woodland cover in Uganda stands at 49,000 km² or 24% of the total land area. Of these 9,242.08 km² is tropical rainforest, 350.60 km² are forest plantations and 39,741.02 km² is woodland. 30% of these areas are protected as national parks, wildlife reserves or central forest reserves.

History 
In the late 1980s, 75,000 square kilometres of land in Uganda consisted of forest and woodland. About 15,000 square kilometres, or 7 percent of Uganda's dry land area, was protected forest reserves. Roughly 250 square kilometres of protected reserves were tree farms. The most important forest products are timber, firewood, charcoal, wood pulp, and paper.

Other important products included leaves for fodder and fertilizer, medicinal herbs, fruits, and fibers, and a variety of grasses used in weaving and household applications. Production of most materials increased as much as 100 percent between 1980 and 1988. The output of timber for construction declined from 1980 to 1985, before increasing slightly to 433 million units in 1987 and continuing to increase in 1988. Paper production also increased substantially in 1988.

Nationwide forest resources were being planted rapidly. Deforestation was especially severe in poverty-stricken areas, where many people placed short-term survival needs ahead of the long-term goal of maintaining the nation's economical sector. Agricultural encroachment, logging, charcoal making, and harvesting for firewood consumed more wooded area each year. An additional toll on forest reserves resulted from wildfires, often the result of illegal moonshine-making activity in reserves. Neither natural regrowth nor tree-planting projects could keep pace with the demand for forest products.

In 1988 the Ministry of Environmental Protection was responsible for implementing forest policy and management. Ministry officials warned that the loss of productive woodlands would eventually lead to land erosion, environmental degradation, energy shortages, food shortages, and rural poverty in general, and they hoped to change traditional attitudes toward forests and other natural resources.

In 1989 the government implemented a six-year forestry rehabilitation project financed by the United Nations Development Program (UNDP) and the Food and Agriculture Organization of the United Nations (FAO). This project included a nationwide tree-planting campaign and a series of three-year training courses for rural extension agents, leaders of women's groups, educators, and farmers. Britain, the Federal Republic of Germany (West Germany), and several multilateral donor agencies also provided assistance in the forestry sector.

Economic crises often hampered efforts to conserve natural resources. Many people lacked the motivation to plan for future generations when their own survival was at risk. As a result, illegal activities, including logging, charcoal making, and firewood gathering in posted reserves contributed to rapid deforestation. Government forestry agents, who were generally underpaid, sometimes sold firewood for their own profit or permitted illegal activities in return for bribes. In these ways, entrenched poverty and corruption drained public resources from use by present and future generations. In 1989 officials threatened to prosecute trespassers in posted forest areas, but by the end of the year, it had not implemented this policy.

2000s 
To revive forestry the government abolished the Forest Department and established the National Forestry Authority (Uganda)(NFA) in 2004. The aim of this action was to increase revenue and quality of the forest management. In the financial year of 2004/2005, the first year after the took over from the Forest Department, the NFA increased the revenue from forest products to USh  or US$2,160,000 from previous year's  or US$480,000 due open puplic tendering of 80.000m³ of timber. Total area of planted trees by the NFA stand at 12 km² in the same year.

The areas under Management of the NFA are gazetted to 506 Central Forest Reserves.

List of protected forests

References